The Rio Grande is a secular cantata by English composer Constant Lambert. Written in 1927, it achieved instant and long-lasting popularity on its appearance on the concert stage in 1929. It is an example of symphonic jazz, not unlike the style of George Gershwin's Rhapsody in Blue, although it is very much Lambert's individual conception. It combines jazzy syncopation with lithe Latin American dance rhythms that create an air of haunting nostalgia. The Rio Grande takes roughly 15 to 20 minutes to perform. It was dedicated to Angus Morrison, who played at its first (broadcast) performance.

The text is a poem by Sacheverell Sitwell, first published in his collection The Thirteenth Caesar, and other Poems (1924). The poem refers to a river in Brazil which flows through a town and over a waterfall, although it is not clear if it is meant to refer to a real location or if it is entirely imaginary. There is a river called Rio Grande in the states of Minas Gerais and São Paulo. There are also states named Rio Grande do Norte and Rio Grande do Sul, as well as a city in the latter state called Rio Grande.

No other work of Lambert's achieved the level of popularity achieved by The Rio Grande. It is still performed regularly today, at the BBC Proms (including the Last Night) and by choral societies in the UK and abroad.

Style
The Rio Grande is scored for alto soloist, mixed chorus, piano, brass, strings and a percussion section of 15 instruments, requiring five players. It combines jazzy syncopations, ragtime and Brazilian influences, harmonies and rhythms inspired by Duke Ellington, with a traditional English choral sound.  The outer sections are brisk, surrounding a central nocturne, which is introduced by a virtuosic solo piano cadenza with percussion. The piano part often plays triplets against duplets, redolent of a rumba.  The coda is based on material from the central section.

Lambert noted in a 1928 article: 

Music critic Christopher Palmer said of this piece that: 

Angus Morrison, discussing the long cadenza accompanied by percussion, noted that:

Creation
The idea for this piece began when in 1923 Lambert attended Will Vodery’s Plantation Orchestra. He later wrote: ‘After the humdrum playing of the English orchestra in the first half, it was electrifying to hear Will Vodery’s band in the Delius-like fanfare which preluded the second. It definitely opened up a new world of sound.’ That "new world of sound" is the syncopated jazz sound that he would incorporate in The Rio Grande. While George Gershwin was clearly a major influence, Vodery's mention shows us that besides Gershwin, the entire jazz and Broadway zeitgeist of the day served as the influence for this piece. Frederick Delius also served as an inspiration. The chorus’s fortissimo opening statement is a direct transcription of the fanfare that appears frequently in Delius' work (the famous "Walk to the Paradise Garden" from A Village Romeo and Juliet, to quote just one instance, has it in almost every bar). Delius knew much about spirituals from living among African-Americans in Florida.

Premieres

Its first performance was a BBC Radio broadcast on 27 February 1928 from the old BBC Studios at Savoy Hill. The piano soloist was Angus Morrison, to whom the work was dedicated. It was popular enough to be repeated six months later.

The first concert performance was in Manchester on 12 December 1929 with Sir Hamilton Harty as piano soloist, and the composer conducting the Hallé Orchestra. It had its London premiere the following day, 13 December, at the Queen's Hall, London, with the same forces.  It was repeated at the subsequent Hallé concert the following month. There was also the first chamber performance, on 15 June 1930 at a party given by the composer Arthur Benjamin at his house in London (66 Carlton Hill, St John's Wood), for two pianos (Benjamin & Julie Lasdun), Albert Whitehead (alto solo), a choir of six, Lambert on percussion taking the part of five players, and William Walton turning the pages.

The piece was also an international success. The first performance in Canada (and in North America), was on 11 February 1930, with Ernest Seitz and the Toronto Symphony Orchestra. It was first heard in New York on 29 January 1931 given by Hugh Ross and the Schola Cantorum with Colin McPhee as the piano soloist. The following April Serge Koussevitzky included it in the 50th anniversary season of the Boston Symphony Orchestra. 

On 28 August 1945, aged just 23, the pianist Kyla Greenbaum first appeared as a soloist at the BBC Proms in a performance of The Rio Grande. It became her calling card, with Lambert saying that he preferred her interpretation to that of Hamilton Harty. She played it again at the Proms on 15 August 1951 with the composer conducting, just days before his death.

Recordings
The composer made two recordings of The Rio Grande as conductor, both of which have held their place in the catalogue:
 11 January 1930: Albert Walter Whitehead (male alto; also seen as A. W. Whitehead, and Alan Whitehead), Sir Hamilton Harty (piano), St Michaels Singers, the Hallé Orchestra.
 14 January 1949: Gladys Ripley (alto), Kyla Greenbaum (piano), Philharmonia Chorus and Orchestra.

Later recordings include:
 Jean Allister (contralto) and Eileen Joyce (piano) with the B.B.C. chorus and the B.B.C. orchestra conducted by Sir Malcolm Sargent, B.B.C. Prom, broadcast 'live' from the Royal Albert Hall, London on Saturday, 12 September 1959  
 Jean Temperley (mezzo-soprano), Cristina Ortiz (piano), the London Madrigal Singers, the London Symphony Orchestra, André Previn (conductor), Angel Records, 1974. 
 Sally Burgess (alto), Jack Gibbons (piano), Chorus of Opera North, English Northern Philharmonia, David Lloyd-Jones (conductor) (this recording was nominated for a Gramophone Award and awarded a Penguin Guide 3-star rosette)
 Della Jones (mezzo), Kathryn Stott (piano), BBC Singers, BBC Concert Orchestra, Barry Wordsworth (conductor).

The poem
 By the Rio Grande
 They dance no sarabande
 On level banks like lawns above the glassy, lolling tide;
 Nor sing they forlorn madrigals
 Whose sad note stirs the sleeping gales
 Till they wake among the trees and shake the boughs,
 And fright the nightingales;
 But they dance in the city, down the public squares,
 On the marble pavers with each colour laid in shares,
 At the open church doors loud with light within.
 At the bell's huge tolling,
 By the river music, gurgling, thin
 Through the soft Brazilian air.
 The Comendador and Alguacil are there
 On horseback, hid with feathers, loud and shrill
 Blowing orders on their trumpets like a bird's sharp bill
 Through boughs, like a bitter wind, calling
 They shine like steady starlight while those other sparks are failing
 In burnished armour, with their plumes of fire,
 Tireless while all others tire.
 The noisy streets are empty and hushed is the town
 To where, in the square, they dance and the band is playing ;
 Such a space of silence through the town to the river
 That the water murmurs loud -
 Above the band and crowd together;
 And the strains of the sarabande,
 More lively than a madrigal,
 Go hand in hand
 Like the river and its waterfall
 As the great Rio Grande rolls down to the sea.
 Loud is the marimba's note
 Above these half -salt waves,
 And louder still the tympanum,
 The plectrum, and the kettle-drum,
 Sullen and menacing
 Do these brazen voices ring.
 They ride outside,
 Above the salt-sea's tide.
 Till the ships at anchor there
 Hear this enchantment,
 Of the soft Brazilian air,
 By those Southern winds wafted,
 Slow and gentle,
 Their fierceness tempered
 By the air that flows between.

References

1927 compositions
Compositions by Constant Lambert
Compositions for piano, chorus and orchestra
Choral compositions
Concertos
Jazz compositions